The Rolls-Royce MT30 (Marine Turbine) is a marine gas turbine engine based on the Rolls-Royce Trent 800 aero engine. The MT30 retains 80% commonality with the Trent 800, the engine for the Boeing 777. The maximum power rating is 40 MW and minimum efficient power 25 MW.

Rolls-Royce announced the MT30 program on 11 September 2001. The first run of the engine was on 6 September 2002. In early 2003 the MT30 was selected to power the Royal Navy future aircraft carriers (CVFs) and the demonstrator of the US Navy's DD(X) multi-mission destroyer. In June 2004 Lockheed Martin awarded the engine contract to the MT30 for its littoral combat ship design.

In 2012 the company repackaged the MT30 so that it would fit into smaller ships, and the first such order came from South Korea, for its s.

Applications
  (UK)
 Type 26 frigate (UK)
  (Australia)
 Canadian Surface Combatant (Canada)
  (US)
  (US)
   - FFG-II (South Korea)
  due to enter service 2022 (Italy)
  (Japan)

See also

References

 Rolls-Royce plc (6 September 2002) Successful first run for new Rolls-Royce engine Press release.

External links
 Rolls-Royce MT30 page

Aero-derivative engines
Gas turbines
Marine engines